Eupithecia longidens is a moth in the  family Geometridae. It is found in North America, including Texas, Arizona, New Mexico, Colorado and Utah.

The wingspan is about 19 mm.

References

Moths described in 1896
longidens
Moths of North America